The Trojan language was the language spoken in Troy during the Late Bronze Age. The identity of the language is unknown, and it is not certain that there was one single language used in the city at the time.

Theories

Luwian 
One candidate language is Luwian, an Anatolian language which was widely spoken in Western Anatolia during the Late Bronze Age. Arguments in favor of this hypothesis include seemingly Luwian-origin Trojan names such as "Kukkunni" and "Wilusiya", cultural connections between Troy and the nearby Luwian-speaking states of Arzawa, and a seal with Hieroglyphic Luwian writing found in the ruins of Troy VIIb1. However, these arguments are not regarded as conclusive. No Trojan name is indisputably Luwian, and some are most likely not, for instance the seemingly Greek name "Alaksandu". Additionally, the exact connection between Troy and Arzawa remains unclear, and in some Arzawan states such as Mira, Luwian was spoken alongside both pre-Indo-European languages and later arrivals such as Greek. Finally, the Luwian seal is by no means sufficient to establish that it was spoken by the city's residents, particularly since it is an isolated example found on an easily transportable artifact.

Greek 
Another candidate language is Greek. disgraced Archaeologist and known Antiquities Forger James Mellaart in the American Journal of Archaeology summarized some of the arguments in favor of this hypothesis:

Lemnian-Etruscan 
Proponents of an east to west migration theory on the origin of the Etruscans like Robert S. P. Beekes place their original homeland adjacent to ancient Troy. The Etruscans called Tyrsenoi in Greek share this name with a people in northwest Anatolia and Herodotus claims the Etruscans sailed from Lydia (the people of which, Beekes contends, lived north of its classical era location) to Italy. Beekes asserts that the presence of a related language on the island of Lemnos (roughly 70km from Troas) represents a remnant from those remaining after the migration from the Proto-Tyrsenian urheimat in northwest Asia Minor. More specific evidence related to the Etruscan relation to Troy is the name Hittite record of the city of Truisa which is supposedly the etimology of both and the story of Aeneas is connected with the arrival of the Etruscans to Italy which Beekes attempts to coroberate with names like Sergestus whom he contends is Anatolian in origin.

In ancient Greek Epics 
In Ancient Greek literature such as the Iliad, Trojan characters are portrayed as having a common language with the Achaeans. However, scholars unanimously interpret this as a poetic convention, and not as evidence that the Trojans were Greek speakers. For instance, Calvert Watkins points out that the Spanish epic poem Cantar de mio Cid portrays its Arab characters as Spanish speakers and that the Song of Roland similarly portrays Arabs as speaking French. Some scholars have suggested that Greek-origin names for Trojan characters in the Iliad motivate a more serious argument for the Trojans having been Greek speakers. Putative etymologies for legendary names have also been used to argue that the Trojans spoke other languages such as Thracian or Lydian. These arguments have been countered on the basis that these languages would have been familiar to classical-era bards and could therefore be later inventions.

See also

References 

Extinct languages
Ancient languages
Trojan War
Unattested languages of Asia